Daniel Stefan Gordon (born 16 January 1985) is a professional footballer who plays as a defender for Karlsruher SC. Born in Germany, he has represented the Jamaica national team.

Club career
Gordon has played for Borussia Dortmund, VfL Bochum, Rot-Weiß Oberhausen, FSV Frankfurt, Karlsruher SC, and SV Sandhausen.

After Gordon's contract with Karlsruher SC expired in summer 2020, the club was still considering an extension in August. In September 2020, he signed a one-year contract with the club.

International career 
Gordon received his first call-up to the Jamaica national team on 30 May 2013 for the forthcoming World Cup qualification match against Mexico. He made his debut on 4 June 2013. Gordon scored his first international goal in the 3–0 friendly victory over Cuba.

International goals 
Score and Result shows Jamaica's goal tally first

|-
| 1. || 31 March 2015 || Montego Bay Sports Complex, Montego Bay, Jamaica ||  ||  ||  || Friendly
|}

Personal life
His father, Gary Gordon, is a British ex-soldier who worked as a youth coach at Borussia Dortmund.

References

Living people
1985 births
Footballers from Dortmund
Association football defenders
German footballers
German people of Jamaican descent
Citizens of Jamaica through descent
Jamaican footballers
Jamaica international footballers
VfL Bochum II players
Borussia Dortmund players
Borussia Dortmund II players
Rot-Weiß Oberhausen players
FSV Frankfurt players
Karlsruher SC players
SV Sandhausen players
Bundesliga players
2. Bundesliga players
3. Liga players
2015 Copa América players